The 2014 Stuttgart World Cup, also known as the EnBW Turn-WeltCup, was an artistic gymnastics competition held from November 28–30 in Stuttgart, Germany.

Medal winners

Result

Team Final

All-Around

External links
  Result site

2014 in gymnastics